Sergei Mikhailovich Kudryavtsev (1915–1998) was a senior Soviet intelligence officer who served as the Soviet Ambassador to Cuba from August 22, 1960 to May 30, 1962. Kudryavtsev did not speak Spanish, nor did he have connections with the Cuban government. As a result, Alexander Alexeyev, who had been in Cuba since 1959, served as his cultural advisor for the duration of his appointment. Kudryavstev was expelled from Cuba in 1962 by Fidel Castro for open and excessive political activities, and was replaced by Alexeyev.

References 

1915 births
1998 deaths
20th-century diplomats
Ambassadors of the Soviet Union to Austria
Ambassadors of the Soviet Union to Cambodia
Ambassadors of the Soviet Union to Cuba
Recipients of the Order of the Red Banner of Labour
Russian diplomats
Soviet diplomats